Haim Cohen-Meguri (born 1 April 1913, died 10 June 2000) was an Israeli politician who served as a member of the Knesset for Herut and Gahal.

Biography
Born in Yemen Vilayet in the Ottoman Empire, Cohen-Meguri made aliyah to Mandatory Palestine in 1921. In 1927 he joined the Revisionist Zionist Betar movement, and in 1935 joined the Irgun.

In 1948 he joined Menachem Begin's Herut movement, and became a member of its central committee and directorate. He was elected to the Knesset on Herut's list in 1949. Although he lost his seat in the 1951 elections, he returned to the Knesset on 6 July 1953 as a replacement for Aryeh Ben-Eliezer. He was re-elected in 1955, 1959, 1961 and 1965, by which time Herut had allied with the Liberal Party under the name Gahal. He lost his seat in the 1969 elections.

In addition to being a member of the Knesset, Cohen-Meguri also served on Netanya's city council and religious council. He died in 2000 at the age of 87.

References

External links
 

1913 births
2000 deaths
Yemeni emigrants to Mandatory Palestine
Israeli people of Yemeni-Jewish descent
Betar members
Irgun members
Herut politicians
Gahal politicians
Members of the 1st Knesset (1949–1951)
Members of the 2nd Knesset (1951–1955)
Members of the 3rd Knesset (1955–1959)
Members of the 4th Knesset (1959–1961)
Members of the 5th Knesset (1961–1965)
Members of the 6th Knesset (1965–1969)